Nishwan Ibrahim (born 12 June 1997) is a Maldivian Olympic swimmer. He represented his country at the 2016 Summer Olympics.

References

External links
 

1997 births
Living people
People from Malé
Maldivian male swimmers
Swimmers at the 2016 Summer Olympics
Olympic swimmers of the Maldives
Swimmers at the 2014 Asian Games
Asian Games competitors for the Maldives